The German Institute for Global and Area Studies (GIGA) is a German research institute. It analyses political, economic and social developments in Africa, Asia, Latin America and the Middle East, and combines this analysis with comparative research on international relations, development and globalisation, violence and security, and political systems. The GIGA advises the Federal Foreign Office and other branches of the federal government. The institute is based in Hamburg and has an office in Berlin. 

The GIGA is a member of the Leibniz Association.

Research
The GIGA is an international research institute committed to a Global Approach to Scholarship and conducts research in the field of area studies, comparative area studies, and on global developments. The researches study the four global regions of Africa, Asia, Latin America, and the Middle East and simultaneously work within the four research programmes on the following issues: Accountability and Participation, Peace and Security, Globalisation and Development, Global Orders and Foreign Policies. The institute employs approximately 160 people, 90 of whom are political scientists, economists, social scientists, peace and conflict researchers, or historians.

Organisation

The institute was founded in 1964 by the City of Hamburg and the Hamburg business community. It was initially the umbrella organisation (Deutsche Übersee Institute (DÜI)) for the Institute of Asian Affairs, the German Orient Institute, the Institute of Latin American Affairs and the Institute of African Affairs. As a consequence of an evaluation of the DÜI in 2004, the institute adopted in 2006 the name "GIGA German Institute of Global and Area Studies"; as of 1 May 2020, the name was changed into "German Institute for Global and Area Studies" ("for" instead of "of", and the acronym "GIGA" is no longer part of the name, but is still used as an acronym).

In the first decade of this century the Institute underwent a transformation that saw the previously relatively autonomous regional institutes united as the German Institute for Global and Area Studies/Leibniz-Institut für Globale und Regionale Studien in 2007. Only the German Orient Institute did not take part in the fusion. However, the GIGA had already hired many of its employees.

The GIGA collaborates with numerous universities, research institutes and expert associations around the world. It is represented on the boards of various academic networks, particularly those related to Africa, Asia, Latin America and the Middle East.

The GIGA is a foundation under civil law and is based in Hamburg. It is jointly funded by the Federal Foreign Office, the Hamburg Ministry of Science and Research and the other federal states. The GIGA also receives external funding, which accounts for around 25 per cent of the total budget.

Since 2014, Prof. Dr. Amrita Narlikar is the president of the GIGA. Together with the president, the GIGA executive board comprises Asia researcher Prof. Dr. Patrick Köllner (GIGA vice president), Middle East academic Prof. Dr. Eckart Woertz, Africa academic Prof. Dr. Matthias Basedau, Latin America expert Prof. Dr. Merike Blofield and Managing Director Dr. Peter Peetz.

International Networks
The GIGA serves as the central coordinator of various academic networks.

The Institutions for Sustainable Peace (ISP) network undertakes research on measures to promote peace in post-war societies with partners from Sweden, Norway, Switzerland, England and Germany.

The Land Matrix project is an online platform that collects global data on large-scale land acquisitions. The GIGA maintains the platform and evaluates the data.

The academics in the Regional Powers Network (RPN) are studying the global rise of the new regional powers. This is a joint project of the GIGA, the University of Oxford and Sciences Po, Paris.

As of July 2014 the GIGA is coordinating the International Diffusion and Cooperation of Authoritarian Regimes (IDCAR) network, as part of which it is investigating, together with 12 international research institutes, the influence of and cooperation between authoritarian regimes on the international stage.

Publications
The GIGA publishes three open access series: the GIGA Focus, the GIGA Working Papers, and the GIGA Journal Family.
 In the GIGA Focus series academics publish short analyses of current global events. The German editions comprise four different regional series (Africa, Asia, Latin America and the Middle East) and the GIGA Focus Global, which covers comparative and global topics. Each edition is published approx. 6 times per year.
 The GIGA Working Papers publish the results of research projects currently underway.
 Through the GIGA Journal Family[ the GIGA publishes articles by academics from around the world. The following journals are part of the journal family:
 Africa Spectrum
 Journal of Current Chinese Affairs (JCCA)
 Journal of Politics in Latin America (JPLA)
 Journal of Current Southeast Asian Affairs (JCSAA)

In addition, the GIGA collaborates with other institutions to publish the Iberoamericana journal and the Africa Yearbook series.

current directors of regional institutes 
 Prof. Dr. Matthias Basedau, Institute for African Studies
 Prof. Dr. Merike Biofield, Institute for Latin American Studies
 Prof. Dr. Patrick Köllner, Institute for Asian Studies
 Prf. Dr. Eckart Woertz, Institute for Middle East Studies

Former DÜI directors 
 Prof. Dr. Klaus Bodemer, Institute of Latin American Affairs 
 Dr. Werner Draguhn, Institute of Asian Affairs (and DÜI)
 Prof. Dr. Robert Kappel, German Overseas Institute (DÜI)
 Prof. Dr. Rolf Hofmeier, Institute for African Affairs
 Prof. Dr. Udo Steinbach, German Orient Institute

References

External links
 GIGA German Institute of Global and Area Studies / Leibniz-Institut für Globale und Regionale Studien
 The GIGA on Facebook
 The GIGA on Twitter
 The GIGA on YouTube
 The GIGA on The Conversation (website)

Foreign policy and strategy think tanks
Political and economic think tanks based in Germany
International relations education
Think tanks established in 2006
Research institutes in Germany
Organisations based in Hamburg
Research institutes of international relations
Think tanks based in Germany
Leibniz Association
1964 establishments in Germany
Independent research institutes